Lee Sampson (born February 16, 1939) was a Canadian football player who played for the Hamilton Tiger-Cats and Toronto Argonauts. He won the Grey Cup with the Tiger-Cats in 1965. He played college football at New Mexico State University.

References

1939 births
Hamilton Tiger-Cats players
Living people